Bayside Marketplace is a two-story open air shopping center located in the downtown Miami, Florida. The center is situated on the banks of Biscayne Bay, with the City of Miami marina on one side. It is a popular attraction in Miami. Different from typical shopping malls, Bayside features entertainment experiences, with live music daily, restaurants, bars, an open-container policy, family events, and a picturesque waterfront setting. Tenancy at the Bayside Marketplace consists of 140 inline spaces, in addition to over 50 carts and kiosks located in and around the center.

History
The entertainment complex opened during a real estate boom in Miami. The shopping center was frequently featured on the crime drama TV series, Miami Vice.

The center is popular with tourists year-round. It is served by the Metrorail at the Government Center and directly by the Metromover at College/Bayside station.

Gallery

References

External links

Bayside Marketplace Official Website
Bayside Marketplace Instagram
Bayside Marketplace Facebook Page

Shopping malls in Miami-Dade County, Florida
Tourist attractions in Miami
Shopping malls established in 1987
Redeveloped ports and waterfronts in the United States
1987 establishments in Florida